The 1984 NCAA Division I Men's Basketball Championship Game was the finals of the 1984 NCAA Division I men's basketball tournament and it determined the national champion for the 1983-84 NCAA Division I men's basketball season  The 1984 National Title Game was played on April 2, 1984 at the Kingdome in Seattle, Washington. The 1984 National Title Game was played between the 1984 West Regional Champions, Georgetown and the 1984 Midwest Regional Champions, Houston.

Georgetown reached the Final Four for the third time in school history and second time in three years to face Kentucky, a team which had never lost a national semifinal game and was led by the "Twin Towers," Sam Bowie and Melvin Turpin. Bowie and Turpin managed to get Ewing into foul trouble early, and with him on the bench and Reggie Williams shooting only 1-for-7 (14.3%) from the field during the game, the Wildcats raced out to a 27–15 lead with 3:06 left in the first half. After that however, the Hoyas made a defensive stand still unequalled in college basketball: Kentucky scored only two more points in the first half; the Wildcats also did not score in the first 9 minutes 55 seconds of the second half, missing their first 12 shots and after that shooting 3-for-21 (14.3%) during the remainder of the game. Overall, Kentucky shot 3-for-33 (9.1 percent) from the field during the second half. Although he played for only 17 minutes and suffered a season-ending foot injury in the second half, Gene Smith had one of the best defensive games of his career. Bowie and Turpin finished the game a combined 0-for-12, Wingate scored 12 points and held Kentuckys Jim Master to 2-for-7 (28.6%) shooting from the field, Michael Jackson scored 12 points and pulled down a career-high 10 rebounds, and Georgetown won 53–40 to advance to the national final for the third time in school history and second time in three years.

In the NCAA final, Georgetown faced Houston on April 2, 1984. Reggie Williams demonstrated his true potential for the first time, putting in a strong defensive performance and shooting 9-for-18 (50.0%) from the field with 19 points and seven rebounds in the game, while Wingate scored 16 points and Ewing managed 10 points and nine rebounds. Jackson scored 11 points and had six assists, two of which set up Ewing and Graham for decisive baskets late in the game. The game was decided well before the final whistle, and the Hoyas won the schools first national championship 84–75. Late in the game, with Georgetown enjoying a comfortable lead, Thompson began to pull starters out and give bench players some time on the court; the game's enduring image came when senior guard Fred Brown came out of the game. Two years earlier at the same stage in New Orleans against North Carolina, after Michael Jordan had given the Tar Heels the lead, Brown had mistakenly passed the ball to James Worthy with less than 15 seconds to go, ruining Georgetowns chances for a final game-winning shot and allowing North Carolina to take the national championship, and cameras had captured Thompson consoling a devastated Brown with a hug as the Tar Heels celebrated. As Brown left the 1984 championship game, cameras caught Brown and Thompson again embracing on the sideline, this time to celebrate a victory.

Participating teams

Houston

Midwest
Houston (2) 77, Louisiana Tech (10) 69
Houston 78, Memphis (6) 71
Houston 68, Wake Forest (4) 63
Final Four
Houston 49, Virginia (7) 47 (OT)

Georgetown

West
Georgetown (1) 37, SMU (9) 36
Georgetown 62, UNLV (5) 48
Georgetown 61, Dayton (10) 49
Final Four
Georgetown 53, Kentucky (1) 40

Starting lineups

Game summary

References

NCAA Division I Men's Basketball Championship Game
NCAA Division I Men's Basketball Championship Games
Houston Cougars men's basketball
Georgetown Hoyas men's basketball
College sports tournaments in Washington (state)
Basketball competitions in Seattle
NCAA Division I Basketball Championship Game, 1984
NCAA Division I Men's Basketball Championship Game
NCAA Division I Basketball Championship Game